The Lola-Aston Martin B09/60, also known as the Aston Martin DBR1-2, is a Le Mans Prototype sports car built by Lola Cars International and co-developed with Prodrive for use by Aston Martin Racing.  It is the first prototype to bear the Aston Martin name since the AMR1 in 1989. Aston Martin's internal name for the car, DBR1-2, refers to the specific DBR1 chassis which won six races in 1959 en route to clinching the World Sportscar Championship as well as that year's 24 Hours of Le Mans.

Development

The B09/60 is an evolution of the Lola B08/60 LMP1 design used by Aston Martin Racing in 2008.  As before it uses the same racing prepared  V12 engine from the Aston Martin DBR9 GT1 car, but with larger air restrictors allowing for an increase of  due to using a production-based engine. This V12 is a little heavier, taller and longer than custom-built prototype racing engines. The standard Lola gearbox was replaced by a more compact Xtrac 6-speed which is operated with paddle-shifting. An unusual feature to the car is the rearward brake cooling, which feeds the air to the brakes through two fans, and eliminates brake ducts on the body.

Racing history

Two B09/60s  competed in the full Le Mans Series season, while a third car entered under the AMR Eastern Europe banner for Charouz Racing Systems also competed at the 2009 24 Hours of Le Mans and in the last three races of the LMS. The number 007 car won the Le Mans Series overall, and the number 009 finished fourth. 

At Le Mans the B09/60 of Jan Charouz, Tomáš Enge and Stefan Mücke finished fourth behind the factory entries of Peugeot and Audi, as well as being the highest finishing petrol-fuelled car. The 008 car was running as high as 3rd overall in the morning until Anthony Davidson had a collision with a GT1 Aston Martin. Subsequent repairs and a 5-minute stop and go penalty—for causing the collision—dropped the car out of contention.

A Lola Aston Martin competed at the 2010 12 Hours of Sebring, which marked the first time the Lola - Aston Martin entered a race in the United States. The Lowe's-sponsored car finishing the race in 3rd position, three laps behind the two winning Peugeots. No factory cars were entered into the 2010 1000 km of Spa. Three cars were also entered into the 2010 24 Hours of Le Mans, although only the 007 and 009 cars were run by Aston Martin Racing; the 008 car was scheduled to be run by the French team Signature-Plus. Both the 008 and 009 cars suffered from problems and had to be retired, leaving only the 007 to finish 6th overall and completing 365 laps, less than it did in 2009. It was the third highest petrol finisher behind Oreca and the LMP2 winner Strakka HPD.

At the 1000 km of Silverstone, the Lola-Aston Martin finished 4th and the highest petrol finisher.

In 2011, the car was raced by Team Cytosport in the American Le Mans Series with regular drivers Klaus Graf and Lucas Luhr. The team failed to finish the first round at the 12 Hours of Sebring, but rebounded by overtaking the polesitting Dyson Racing car at Long Beach to take the win. The team went on to win again at Mosport, Mid-Ohio and Road America and finished the season in second place in the LMP1 category behind Dyson Racing.

With Aston Martin Racing switching to their new car, the AMR-One for the 2011 24 Hours of Le Mans, a B09/60 was entered by Kronos Racing in cooperation with fellow Belgian outfit Marc VDS Racing Team. The car was driven by Vanina Ickx, Bas Leinders and Maxime Martin and finished the race seventh overall, twenty-seven laps behind the race winning Audi R18 TDI.

After suffering reliability problems and a lack of speed with its new AMR-One prototype, Aston Martin Racing reverted to using a B09/60 for the final three rounds of the 2011 Intercontinental Le Mans Cup as well as round eight of the 2011 American Le Mans Series season, the American Le Mans Monterey at Mazda Raceway Laguna Seca.. The lone factory Aston started third behind the two Dyson Lola machines, but the race would end with the Aston winning by three laps, notching up another victory for the car. The car also got a surprise podium finish at Petit Le Mans after 3 of the 4 factory cars (Audi and Peugeot) crashed.

Gallery

References

External links

 Aston Martin Racing

Aston Martin racing cars
Le Mans Prototypes
Aston Martin LMP1
Sports prototypes